The Cathedral of Our Lady of the Assumption of Maasin (Spanish: Catedral de Nuestra Señora de la Asunción de Maasin), commonly known as the Maasin City Cathedral is a baroque Roman Catholic church in Maasin City, Southern Leyte, Philippines.

The church is home to one of the oldest parishes of the country. The cathedral also houses a 200-year old antique statue of the Nuestra Señora de la Asunción de Maasin or known as the "Patrona". The Maasin parish established by the series of waves of missionaries namely the Jesuits, Augustinians and finally, Franciscans. Originally built in 1700 by Jesuit priests, the church suffered several destruction and damage over the years, but has been rebuilt many times by the orders succeeding the Jesuits. Its present-day structure is constructed at 1968 and subsequently became the seat of the Roman Catholic Diocese of Maasin which covers the City of Maasin and the other municipalities of Southern Leyte, including the towns of Matalom, Bato, Hilongos, Hindang, Inopacan and Baybay of province of Leyte.

History

Early records indicate that Maasin is one of the oldest towns in Southern Leyte. When the Spanish missionaries arrived there, they found the native population to be relatively organized, friendly and interested in the Catholic faith. The Jesuits were the first order to formally establish a parish in the community in the 1700s. A piece of stone from a destroyed convent bearing the inscription "Pa. De Tagnipa - año 1776." authenticates the establishment. The ruins exist until the present time, lying between the border of Abgao and Mantahan districts.

Unfortunately, the province suffered heavily from the attacks of the Moro people's resistance against Spanish colonizers and the original church was destroyed in 1754. Following the departure of the Jesuits, the Augustinian fathers took over the parish in 1771 and ordered the construction of the second concrete church a kilometer away from the ruins of the first one. This is the present-day location of the church. However, it suffered another extensive damage in the hands of the Moros on 1784. Another wave of missionaries came in 1843, this time the Franciscans, and they succeeded on establishing Our Lady of Assumption as the Patroness of the Parish on August 15. The people continued to celebrate August 15 as the town's official fiesta until the present time. The Franciscans managed over the ecclesiastical order until 1896 until they are forced to leave due to the revolution, which established the short-lived Philippine republic in the municipal government under the order of General Lukban. After the tumultuous events, a native clergy took over the church.

By 1920s until 1930s, the parish was placed in the care of the diocesan priests of Cebu. It was then transferred to the Diocese of Calbayog and Diocese of Palo, until in 1968, it became the cathedral seat of the Diocese of Maasin on August 14. It ranks as the Cathedral Parish of the diocese.

The diocese comprises the entire province of Southern Leyte, and the towns of Matalom, Bato, Hilongos, Hindang, Inopacan and Baybay in the province of Leyte, with the Maasin Parish Cathedral as the seat of the diocese. Distributed within its 2,505 square kilometers of land are 38 parishes and 1 quasi-parish. To facilitate administration these parishes have been grouped under 6 vicariates.

The province of Southern Leyte is located in the southeastern portion of the island of Leyte. And the small island of Limasawa off its southern coast is historically significant as the place where Magellan landed, after having sailed from the island of Homonhon in Samar, to celebrate the first Catholic mass in the Philippines. The chieftain of Limasawa, Kolambu and his men, with Magellan and his men, attended that first mass celebrated by Father Pedro Valderrama. Until 1960, the island of Limasawa belonged to the island province of Leyte.

Leyte and Samar were once considered one single political unit by the Spanish government, falling under the administration of the government of Cebu. They were separated from Cebu in 1735 but still remained as a single province until 1768, when they were finally split into two provinces, with Tacloban as the capital of the entire island province of Leyte. In 1960 Southern Leyte was made a separate province with Maasin as its capital.

The population of Southern Leyte is made up mostly of Cebuano-speaking people because of its closeness, geographically, to Cebu and Bohol. This population has now reached a total of 558,804, of which 90 per cent are Catholics.

In recent years, awareness of their potent role in the local church has been perceived among the lay faithful – a result of diocesan programs designed to awaken the "sleeping giant" in the church. There has been a marked increase in the number of lay ministers to assist priests in every parish, as there has been in the number of volunteer catechists.

The Diocese of Maasin today has started to focus on the vision of the Second Plenary Council of the Philippines. Apart from the usual ministerial and sacramental functions, the clergy has succeeded to penetrate the people's conscience with concern for other issues, such as reforestation, among others.

The Social Action Center has generously offered help in livelihood projects to those who do not have the necessary capital. This has been successful in the abaca business enterprise. The center is now in the process of opening up more opportunities for more livelihood projects.

The Commission on Youth is helping in the formation of the youth in all the parishes of the diocese through youth encounters and leadership training. It has organized three diocesan summer youth camps between 1993 and 1995, attended by more than a thousand delegates.

In 1993 the Diocese of Maasin marked its 25th anniversary as a diocese. The theme of the celebration set the direction which the diocese will follow in the next decade: "RENEWAL: the challenge of the faithful in the Diocese of Maasin."

Thus the vision that was planted and took root when Father Pedro Valderrama celebrated the first mass in the Philippines on March 21, 1521, has borne new fruit. Aside from the prospects of renewal for the entire diocese, the Chaplaincy of Limasawa was raised to that of a parish – the Holy Cross and First Mass of Limasawa Parish, on March 29, 1994, more than four centuries later.

Golden Jubilee Celebration 

In 2018, the Diocese of Maasin celebrated its 50th Golden Jubilee Anniversary and some activities and the Concluding Mass of the Year Long Celebration was instituted in the Maasin Cathedral. The Golden Jubilee Vigil of 10,000 Youth and the Thanksgiving Mass were joined and presided over by Luis Antonio Cardinal Tagle, S.T.D., D.D. from the Archdiocese of Manila together with Bishop Precioso Cantillas, S.D.B., D.D. from the host, the Diocese of Maasin, Bishop Gabriele Giordano Caccia, J.C.D., D.D. the Apostolic Nuncio and Papal Representative to the Philippines, Archbishop José S. Palma, D.D., S.Th.D. from the Archdiocese of Cebu, Archbishop Romulo Valles D.D. from the Archdiocese of Davao and the president of the Catholic Bishops' Conference of the Philippines and Bishop Leopoldo C. Jaucia, S.V.D., D.D. from the Diocese of Bangued. In recognition of the numerous miracles that were attributed to the intercession of Nuestra Señora de la Asuncion de Maasin, on the closing rites of the Golden Jubilee of the Diocese of Maasin, the altar image or the "Patrona" received the honor of Episcopal Coronation headed by  Cardinal Tagle on August 15, 2018, during the Thanksgiving Mass and the Solemnity of the Assumption of Mary.

Patroness 

In the City of Maasin, Southern Leyte, known for its scenic tourist spots, especially for nature lovers, the people developed a strong devotion to the venerated image of Our Lady of the Assumption. For centuries, numerous miracles were reported through her intercession, most well known is the protection of her chosen city from different calamities. There were two images of the Our Lady of the Assumption enshrined in her Cathedral in Maasin City, the original wooden image and the ivory altar and processional image.

The Original Wooden Image of the Virgen de la Asuncion de Maasin

The original wooden image of Nuestra Señora de la Asuncion is a de tallado image where the Virgin is standing on a cloud with cherubs, has loose yet wavy hair, her right hand is outstretched and her left was on her chest looking upwards. The original yet fragile image is currently enshrined in a special chapel dedicated to her for veneration.

The Original Ivory Image of the Nuestra Señora de la Asunción de Maasin also known as the "Patrona"

The second image was that of a de vestir image where the body was made of wood and her head and hands are made of ivory. The image is vested with a robe and a cloak made from different materials and embroidery styles offered by her devotees. This image presents the Virgin with her arms outstretched upwards and eyes looking upwards. This image sports a crown and is the current altar and processional image of the cathedral. In recognition of the numerous miracles that were attributed to the intercession of Nuestra Señora de la Asuncion de Maasin, on the closing rites of the Golden Jubilee of the Diocese of Maasin, the altar image received the honor of Episcopal Coronation on 15 August 2018 - the Solemnity of the Assumption of the Blessed Virgin Mary headed by Cardinal Tagle. Pope Francis later granted a decree of canonical coronation on 14 December 2021 and the image of the Virgin was crowned by Charles John Brown, Papal Nuncio to the Philippines, on 13 August 2022.

Features of the Cathedral

The Main Church Building

The present design heavily borrows from the characteristics of baroque churches in the Philippines, with its traditional triangular pediment and simple facade punctuated by rectangular niches for the images and windows. However, a seemingly modern style was applied as shown by its rounded, three-layered bell tower which is a common feature among late-18th-century churches.

Plaza Asuncion

Beside the cathedral is the "Plaza Asunción" which showcases the beautiful image of the Our Lady of the Assumption that was transferred from inside the cathedral to the plaza.

Located at its back is the OLAP Office Building and the Chapel of the Original Wooden Image of the Virgen de la Asunción de Maasin.

The Patrona
Following the Second Vatican Council, there was reform and renewal in which old retablos were removed, as happened in the Cathedral in Maasin City. The 200-year old image of the Patrona (Our Lady of the Assumption) was placed in the care of a local family from the late 1970s

Through the directive of Precioso D. Cantillas, SDB, DD, the Patrona was restored into a new Baldachino on 24 September 2015.

References 

http://www.dioceseofmaasin.org/goldenjubilee/index.php?page=5
http://pintakasi1521.blogspot.com/2019/08/nuestra-senora-de-la-asuncion-de-maasin.html
http://www.dioceseofmaasin.org/?page=mainnews&nid=11&skey=Mary http://www.dioceseofmaasin.org/?page=mainnews&nid=11&skey=Maruy
http://lexicalcrown.blogspot.com/2017/02/our-lady-of-assumption-parish-cathedral.html
https://www.inspirock.com/philippines/maasin/maasin-cathedral-a368382977

Roman Catholic churches in Southern Leyte
Roman Catholic cathedrals in the Philippines